With all other disciplines having been cancelled, the 1975 Summer Universiade only featured athletics events and was referred to as the World University Championships in athletics. The competition was held in Rome between 18 and 21 September.

Medal summary

Men's events

Women's events

Medal table

References
World Student Games (Universiade - Men) - GBR Athletics
World Student Games (Universiade - Women) - GBR Athletics

 
Athletics at the Summer Universiade
Uni
1975 Summer Universiade
1975 Summer Universiade
1975 Universiade